Benedict of Sausetun (or Benedict of Sawston) was a medieval Bishop of Rochester.

Life

Benedict was from Sawston in Cambridgeshire. He was a canon of the diocese of London from 1196 and held the prebend of Neseden. From 1204 he was precentor of St Paul's, London. He was elected to the see of Rochester on 13 December 1214 and was consecrated on either 25 January 1215 or 22 February 1215. At some point between 1217 and 1221 he served as a baron of the exchequer. He died on 18 December 1226 and was buried on 21 December 1226.

Citations

References

 British History Online Bishops of Rochester accessed on 30 October 2007
 British History Online Prebendaries of Nesden accessed on 30 October 2007
 British History Online Precentors of London accessed on 30 October 2007
 
 

Bishops of Rochester
People from Sawston
13th-century English Roman Catholic bishops
1226 deaths
Year of birth unknown